Raymond Earl Middleton (February 8, 1907 – April 10, 1984) was an American singer and stage, TV and movie actor.

Early years
Middleton was born in Chicago, Illinois, and attended the University of Illinois.

Career
Soon after he graduated from college, Middleton sang with the Detroit Civic Opera Company, after which he sang with the St. Louis Opera Company and the Chicago Civic Opera. He declined to join the Metropolitan Opera Company, preferring a career in film.

In 1933, Middleton appeared in the Broadway play Roberta. Later in 1938, he appeared in the musical Knickerbocker Holiday. During the early 1940s, he appeared in the movies Gangs of Chicago, the original Hurricane Smith (playing the title role), and Lady for a Night, which starred Joan Blondell and John Wayne. He served in the U.S. Army Air Forces in World War II, appearing in the Air Forces show Winged Victory.

Superman was featured at the World of Tomorrow exhibit as the "Man of Tomorrow", where Middleton donned the costume and served as the first actor to portray Superman in public. "Superman Day" occurred on July 3, 1940 at the New York World's Fair.  

In 1946, he co-starred with Ethel Merman in the Broadway production of Annie Get Your Gun. In 1948, he starred in Love Life with Nanette Fabray. 

In 1950, he co-starred with Mary Martin in South Pacific, succeeding Ezio Pinza. In 1965, he played the innkeeper in Man of La Mancha.

In television, Middleton's appearances included The Ed Sullivan Show (once as a guest host), the Colgate Comedy Hour, and Chrysler's Shower of Stars in the 1950s. He co-starred with Phil Silvers and Lee Remick in a 1967 TV adaptation of Damn Yankees!.

During the 1970s, Middleton appeared in the TV movie Hec Ramsey as a judge, in the musical movie 1776, as Colonel Thomas McKean, and in the first TV adaptation of Helter Skelter as ranch-owner George Spahn. He also voiced the character Pepperino in the cartoon Tubby the Tuba.

Middleton's last appearances were as Cardinal Reardon in an episode of M*A*S*H ("Blood Brothers", featuring Patrick Swayze), and as grandfather Huey Rush in the comedy Too Close for Comfort.

Middleton died in Panorama City, California at the age of 77.

Filmography

Film

Television

References

External links
 
 
 

American male film actors
American male stage actors
American male television actors
Male actors from Chicago
1907 births
1984 deaths
20th-century American male actors
20th-century American singers
Actors from Illinois
United States Army Air Forces personnel of World War II